Winston Churchill High School, often referred to as WCHS, Churchill High School, CHS or Churchill, is a high school in Potomac, Maryland, United States, an unincorporated section of Montgomery County.

The school is named after Winston Churchill, a British statesman and politician who was Prime Minister of the United Kingdom during World War II. Founded in 1964 as Potomac High School, the school's name was changed to "Winston Churchill High School" a year later.

Churchill is part of the Montgomery County Public Schools system. The majority of the students come from Herbert Hoover Middle School (75%) and Cabin John Middle School (25%).

Administration 
The current principal of Winston Churchill High School is John W. Taylor. Before being appointed in 2021, Taylor was the principal of Cabin John Middle School

School awards and recognition
Churchill has been ranked in the top 100 high schools in the United States for years, climbing to 42 in 2007 and 75 in 2017. Churchill earned the 2007 Maryland Blue Ribbon Award and was selected by the U.S. Department of Education as a 2007 National No Child Left Behind Blue Ribbon School. In 2012, Churchill was rated the best high school in Maryland and fifth among non-magnet schools nationally according to U.S. News & World Report. In 2016, the same report ranked Winston Churchill High School 94th in national ranking, 2nd in Maryland High Schools and 146th in STEM High Schools with 83.9 (out of 100) College Readiness Index. In 2017, Churchill was ranked the best high school in Maryland and 75th in the nation by U.S. News.

Departments and programs
Churchill has nine academic departments: Art, Computer Science, English, Foreign Language, Mathematics, Performing Arts, Physical Education, Science, and Social Studies.

Autism Program
The Autism Program provides a program for students with low-functioning autism. These students learn how to improve their skills at undertaking certain tasks and also learn speech.

Signature Program
The Signature Program allows students to follow one of several course paths to specialize in a particular career field. The program comprises three academies: the Academy of Math, Science, & Technology; the Academy of International Studies; and the Academy of Creative and Performing Arts.

Bridge Program
The Bridge Program provides a program for adolescents and young adults with learning/emotional disabilities. The program intends to foster academic skill development and alter behaviors that interfere with academic learning. It is supervised by an interdisciplinary team intended to meet the needs of socially vulnerable middle and high school students who may be challenged by problem-solving abstract thinking, organizing and planning, interpreting social cues, establishing relationships with peers, coping with anxiety, changes in routine, and transitioning.

Performing arts
Many theater productions are put on regularly, including a night of one act plays. The One Acts Festival is student-produced, directed, and funded by the drama club. Churchill also has a choir program. Showstoppers is a mixed-gender show choir group, while Jazz Ambassadors is a mixed-gender choir. Both groups regularly compete within Montgomery County, regionally, and nationally. Churchill also hosts an annual show choir competition.

Churchill's choral music groups are Voice of a Generation (VOAG), Jazz Ambassadors, and Showstoppers.

Voice of a Generation is a non-audition group for students who like to sing and learn about the study of music. Students learn to sight-read, read music, and improve their performance skills.

Jazz Ambassadors is a coed ensemble selected through auditions, focusing on developing vocal technique. Most songs are challenging jazz music, but this is often stretched to arrangements of different kinds of music like pop or classical.

Showstoppers is an honors show choir group of students selected through auditions who previously held choir positions at Churchill. This group features musically challenging music. Most music is popular, but any musical style, including sacred and secular works, is rehearsed and performed.

In 2007, Churchill's fall production of Singin' in the Rain was nominated for six Cappies High School Theater Awards, winning Best Orchestra (for the third consecutive year), Best Cameo Actor, and Best Cameo Actress. Only one other school received more awards.

In 2009, Churchill's fall production of Rent: School Edition was nominated for four Cappies High School Theater Awards: Best Male Vocalist, Best Female Vocalist, Best Orchestra, and Best Song. Churchill won awards for Best Female Vocalist as well as Best Orchestra.

Many students form bands, typically of a rock variety, and the school occasionally facilitates this by sponsoring a battle of the bands or band performance. The school has sponsored day-long concerts on school grounds; the Merritthon, a fundraising event for Leukemia research, occurred annually from 2002 to 2004.

In 2009, the instrumental music program won four awards at the Windy City Classic, including Best Symphonic Band, Best Orchestra, Best Classical Soloist, and Best Overall Program. The jazz band received second place in that category. All three groups received a gold rating.

Publications
Churchill produces three publications, all of which have won awards: its newspaper, The Churchill Observer; its yearbook, Finest Hours; and its literary magazine, Erehwon.

Controversies 
In January 2010, a criminal investigation exposed a grade-changing scandal at Churchill.

During the 2016–2017 year, on a day with a basketball game between Winston Churchill High School and Walter Johnson High School, Walter Johnson High School students defaced Winston Churchill High School property with vulgar graffiti. This caused $100,000 in damage.

Athletics
Winston Churchill High School offers the following sports:

Fall
 Cheerleading
 Cross-country
 Field hockey
 Football
 Golf
 Poms
 Boys' soccer
 Girls' soccer
 Girls' tennis
 Girls' volleyball
 Handball

Winter
 Boys' basketball
 Girls' basketball
 Cheerleading
 Ice hockey (independent club)
 Poms
 Indoor track
 Swimming and diving
 Wrestling
 Bocce ball

Spring
 Baseball
 Softball
 Coed softball
 Boys' lacrosse
 Girls' lacrosse
 Boys' tennis
 Girls' tennis
 Track and field
 Boys' volleyball
 Coed volleyball
 Ultimate frisbee

State championships

Notable alumni
Susan C. Lee (class of 1972) – state senator, Maryland General Assembly
Samuel L. Stanley (class of 1972) – President, Michigan State University
Elisa New (class of 1976) – professor of English at Harvard University
Brian Holloway (class of 1977) – professional football player, All-Pro, Stanford graduate, NFL first-round draft pick
Jeffrey Allan Kemp (class of 1977) – NFL player, quarterback for Los Angeles Rams, Seattle Seahawks, San Francisco 49ers; son of Jack Kemp
Michael Hardt (class of 1978) – philosopher, author
Cheryl Kagan (class of 1979) – state senator, Maryland General Assembly
Kenny Kramm (class of 1979) – entrepreneur, inventor of FLAVORx
Darren Star (class of 1979) – television creator and producer (Beverly Hills, 90210, Melrose Place, Sex and the City, Younger)
Marti Leimbach (class of 1981) – novelist 
Bruce Murray (class of 1983) – international soccer player; two-time All-American at Clemson; selected to College Team of the Century; member of 1988 Summer Olympics and 1990 FIFA World Cup soccer teams; National Soccer Hall of Fame
Paul Palmer (class of 1983) – NFL player, first-round draft pick
Lori Alan Denniberg (class of 1984) – actress and voice actor
Deborah Copaken (class of 1984) – writer and photojournalist (Shutterbabe)
Jonathan Holloway (class of 1985) – professor and dean at Yale University, president of Rutgers University
Jennie Koch Easterly (class of 1986) – U.S. Army officer, federal government official
Mike Sacks (class of 1986) – magazine editor, humor writer
Julie Kent (class of 1987) – American Ballet Theatre, principal dancer for 22 years
Mike Barrowman (class of 1987) – swimmer, 1992 Olympic gold medalist, 200-meter breaststroke
Rochelle Walensky (class of 1987) – Director of the Centers for Disease Control and Prevention
Jimmy Kemp (class of 1989) – CFL football player, president of the Jack Kemp Foundation
Jordan Ellenberg (class of 1989) – mathematician and author, How Not to Be Wrong
Tim Sweeney (class of 1989) – founder of Epic Games; most known for Fortnite
Rachel Nichols (class of 1991) – ESPN reporter
Jeff Halpern (class of 1994) – NHL player, first from Southeast U.S.
Robyn Cohen (class of 1994) – actress
Dhani Jones (class of 1996) – NFL player, TV personality, The Travel Channel and CNBC
Bryan Cogman (class of 1997) (did not graduate) – Emmy Award-winning writer, Game of Thrones
Ben Feldman (class of 1998) – actor, Drop Dead Diva, Mad Men, Superstore
Gibran Hamdan (class of 1998) (did not graduate) – NFL player, backup quarterback for Washington Redskins
Kelen Coleman (class of 2002) – actress, The Office, The Mindy Project, The Newsroom, The McCarthys
Jerome Dyson (class of 2005) (did not graduate) - professional basketball player
Euguen Leon (class of 2008) – actor and voice actor (JoJo's Bizarre Adventure: Stone Ocean, Ghost in the Shell: SAC_2045)
Kamie Crawford (class of 2010) – Miss Teen USA 2010
Shinsaku Uesugi (class of 2010) – chess player (Chess Olympiad)
Joshua Coyne (class of 2011) – composer and musician
Taylor Momsen (class of 2011) (did not graduate) – actor (How the Grinch stole Christmas, Spy Kids, Gossip Girl); musician (The Pretty Reckless)
Eric Brodkowitz (class of 2014), Israeli-American baseball pitcher for the Israel national baseball team
Noah Bratschi (class of 2018), professional speed climber, American record holder, Bronze medalist World Championships, World Cup silver medalist, 9x US World Team

References

External links
Churchill statistics from MCPS
Maryland Public Secondary Schools Athletic Association
The Churchill Observer
churchillathletics.com

Schools in Potomac, Maryland
Public high schools in Montgomery County, Maryland
1964 establishments in Maryland
Educational institutions established in 1964